This is a list of defunct Philippine Basketball Association teams, both regular and guest.

Defunct franchises

*Acquiring team still active

Genealogies
These are the franchise lineage of present PBA teams (present to oldest):
 Blackwater
 Converge → Hills Bros./Alaska
 Gilbey's Gin/St. George Whisky/Añejo Rhum/Gordon's Gin/Ginebra San Miguel
 Purefoods/B-Meg/San Mig Coffee/Star/Magnolia Chicken → Tanduay (1987)
 Meralco → Sta. Lucia → Great Taste/Presto
 NLEX → Shopinas.com/Air21 → Red Bull/Barako Bull (2000)
 GlobalPort/NorthPort → Coca-Cola/Powerade → Pop Cola/Diet Sarsi/Swift/Sunkist
 Rain or Shine → Shell → Crispa
 Phoenix Super LPG → FedEx/Air21/Burger King/Barako Bull Energy → Tanduay (1999)
 Royal Tru-Orange/Gold Eagle Beer/Magnolia/Petron Blaze/San Miguel Beer
 Kia/Mahindra/Columbian/Terrafirma
 Pepsi/7-Up/Mobiline/Talk 'N Text/TNT

These are the franchise lineage of defunct PBA teams (oldest to latest):
 Carrier/Quasar/Fiberlite
 7-Up (1975) → Filmanbank → Galleon/CDCP
 Mariwasa Noritake/Mariwasa Honda/Finance Inc./Galerie Dominique
 U/Tex → Manhattan/Sunkist/Winston/Country Fair
 Toyota → Manila Beer/Beer Hausen
 Tefilin

All records of a franchise cease after it is acquired by a new company, except for:

The Pepsi/7-Up/Mobiline/Talk 'N Text/TNT franchise: Before the start of the 1996 season, Frederick Dael took over as the new president of Pepsi Cola Products Philippines, Inc. (PCPPI). As such, a change in marketing priority took effect and PCPPI was considering to disband its PBA team. To prevent the disbandment, Luis Lorenzo Sr., chairman of PCPPI, intended to sell the franchise to Duty Free Philippines for one peso (P1) to retain its franchise. Should Duty Free disband the PBA franchise, it would be returned to PCPPI. The sale was rejected by the Board of Governors on a special meeting on January 5, 1996, since Duty Free was not majority-owned by Lorenzo. After the All-Filipino Cup, PBA Board of Governors approved the transfer of the franchise from PCPPI to Lapanday Holdings Corporation, Lorenzo's holding company. This would enable Lorenzo to use a different brand for his PBA team. In May 1996, Pagemark Philippines, Inc., a company under Lapanday Holdings, and Pilipino Telephone Corporation (Piltel) were tasked to find a new name for the team. After negotiations, the team was rechristened as the Mobiline Cellulars. Since Lorenzo still owned the team, the records of the Pepsi team were retained.

The Tanduay franchise: Originally owned by Elizalde & Company Inc., Tanduay was one of the founding teams of the league. In 1988, the Elizalde group sold the Tanduay business assets to Lucio Tan and its PBA franchise to Pure Foods Corporation (Purefoods) as an expansion team. When Tanduay rejoined the PBA in 1999, the records of the original Tanduay team (1975–1987) were carried over.

Air21 Express and Barako Bull Energy records
A unique situation regarding the Air21 Express' team records occurred before the start of the 2011–12 season when the Lina Group of Companies acquired the Red Bull/Barako Bull PBA franchise from Photokina Marketing Corporation (along with the "Barako Bull" brand). This team was renamed as the Shopinas.com Clickers. At the same time, the Fedex/Air21/Burger King franchise was renamed "Barako Bull Energy". After the dismal performance of Shopinas.com during the Philippine Cup, the Lina Group decided to rename the team as Air21 Express.

After the two franchises switched names in 2012, the Shopinas.com/Air21 team was now considered as a new team. The team records and transaction history of its predecessor, FedEx/Air21/Burger King, were transferred to the new Barako Bull team. The lineage, team records and championships of the Red Bull/Barako Bull team were not carried over to either of the two franchises, except for the transaction history involving trades which were carried over to the Shopinas.com/Air21 team, following several precedents (the franchise acquisitions between Shell-Welcoat, Sta. Lucia-Meralco and Powerade-GlobalPort).

To create a distinction between the two Air21 franchises, the original is abbreviated as "AIR21" and the second one as "AIR21X" in the official PBA annual, Hardcourt. In some instances, the team records of the original Air21 franchise is "shared" with the second Air21 franchise. An example would be during the jersey retirement of Vergel Meneses – although he played for the original Air21 franchise, his jersey was retired by the second Air21 franchise.

Guest teams
 Bay Area Dragons (2022–23 PBA Commissioner's Cup runner-up)
 Smart Gilas national basketball team (2009–10 and 2010–11)
 UBC Thunderbirds (2004 PBA Fiesta Conference)
 U.S. Mail and More Pro-Am Selection (2004 PBA Fiesta Conference)
 Yonsei University (2003 Invitational)
 Magnolia-Jilin Tigers (2003 Invitational)
 KK Novi Sad (2003 Invitational)
 Northern Consolidated Cement (1985 PBA Reinforced Conference champions)
 Philippine national basketball team (on various occasions from 1986–2003)
 South Korea (1982)
 Nicholas Stoodley (1980 PBA Invitational champions)
 Adidas (1980)
 Emtex (1977)
 Ramrod (1977)

Graphical timeline

Key: Red = founding franchises; yellow = 1970s; blue = 1980s; orange = 1990s; green = 2000s; purple = 2010s; light purple = 2020s

See also
All-time Philippine Basketball Association team standings

References